The OTR-23 Oka (named after Oka River) was a mobile theatre ballistic missile deployed by the Soviet Union near the end of the Cold War to replace the obsolete SS-1C 'Scud B'. It carried the GRAU index 9K714 and was assigned the NATO reporting name SS-23 Spider.  The introduction of the Oka significantly strengthened Soviet theatre nuclear capabilities as its range and accuracy allowed it not only to strike hardened NATO targets such as airfields, nuclear delivery systems, and command centers, but moving targets as well.  It also had a fast reaction time, being able to fire in approximately five minutes, and was nearly impossible to intercept, thereby allowing it to penetrate defenses.

The main components of the 9K714 system were:
 the transport and launch vehicle PU 9P71, based on the amphibious BAZ-6944
 the similar transporter-loader TZM 9T230 with one spare missile and equipped with a hydraulic crane
 the re-supply vehicle TM 9T240, a ZIL-131 tractor with semi-trailer to transport a missile (in transport container 9Ya249) and a warhead (in a 9Ya251 container)

The operational life of the Oka was limited and controversial. The Soviet military asserted that the Oka had a maximum range of 250 miles (400 km). American experts, however, estimated it had a greater range. In 1987, Mikhail Gorbachev proposed to George Shultz that he would unilaterally remove all Okas, if it would prevent the United States from building up its own short-range nuclear forces in Europe, despite the fact that the Soviet military was in favor of the Oka. Shultz however lacked the authority to act on the suggestion. Gorbachev included the Oka in the class of systems to be discontinued as part of the INF Treaty as a gesture of goodwill, even though Soviet assertions of its maximum range did not put it outside the specifications of the treaty.

There was diplomatic controversy over this weapons system in April 1990, when the Soviets informed the US of their covert transfer of at least 120 missiles to the Warsaw Pact states of Czechoslovakia, Bulgaria, and East Germany during the time of negotiation of the Intermediate-Range Nuclear Forces Treaty.  Evidence indicates that the missiles were transferred with conventional warheads only, although equipment to load Soviet nuclear warheads was apparently retained.

Missile variants 

 The 9M714B missile armed with the AA-60 (9N63) nuclear warhead and possessing a maximum range of 500 km
 The 9M714F missile armed with a FRAG-HE warhead weighing 450 kg and possessing a maximum range of 450 km
 The 9M714K missile armed with a submunitions warhead 9N74K weighing 715 kg and possessing a maximum range of 300 km

In addition to these warheads, the OTR-23 Oka was also reported to be able to deliver chemical munitions.

Operators

Former operators
  Phased out in 2002
  Phased out in the 1990s
  Passed on to successor states
  Phased out in the 1990s, shortly before the reunification with West-Germany
  Phased out in 2000
  Phased out as directed by the INF Treaty

See also 
 List of missiles

Notes

External links

 9К714 "Ока" (Russian
 Global Security: SS-23 Spider
 Komplex 9K714 Oka (Czech)
 9K714 "Oka" (German)
 Oka (SS-23 Spider) - Military-Today
 SS-23 (Spider) / 9K714 Oka - Military Factory
 OTR - 23 "Oka" - Enemy Forces
 Oka - Encyclopedia Astronautica

Theatre ballistic missiles
Cold War missiles of the Soviet Union
Votkinsk Machine Building Plant products
KB Mashinostroyeniya products
Cluster munition
Military equipment introduced in the 1970s